Judgmental Films is the production company of animator/film director Mike Judge, the creator of Beavis and Butt-Head, and a co-creator of King of the Hill.

Original programming

Adult animation

Live action

Feature films

Animated

Live action

Other projects
 The Animation Show
 The Honky Problem
 Milton
 Frog Baseball
 "The Wind"

References

Works by Mike Judge
Adult animation studios
American animation studios
Companies based in Los Angeles
Film production companies of the United States
Mass media companies established in 1991
Television production companies of the United States